Russell County may  refer to:

In Australia:
 Russell Land District, formerly Russell County, Tasmania
 County of Russell, South Australia

In Canada:
Russell County, Ontario

In the United States:

 Russell County, Alabama
 Russell County, Kansas
 Russell County, Kentucky
 Russell County, Virginia